Dizoniopsis concatenata is a species of sea snail, a gastropod in the family Cerithiopsidae. It was described by Conti in 1864.

References

Cerithiopsidae
Gastropods described in 1864